Rukn al-Din, Rukn ad-Din or Rukn ud-Din is a honorific title, now used as a given name. It may refer to:

Abu Muhammad al-Juwayni (died 1046), renowned Islamic scholar.
Abu al-Muzaffar Rukn ud-Dīn Barkyāruq bin Malikšāh (died 1105), sultan of Great Seljuq
 Abbas ibn Abi al-Futuh (died 1154), Fatimid vizier
Rukn al-Dīn Mas'ūd, or Mesud I (died 1156), sultan of the Seljuqs of Rûm
Rukn ad-Din Suleiman Shah, or Süleymanshah II (1196–1204), Seljuq Sultan of Rûm
Rukn al-Din Khurshah (died 1256), 27th Imam of the Nizari Isma'ili Shia community
al-Malik al-Zahir Rukn al-Din Baibars al-Bunduqdari (1223–1277), Mamluk Sultan of Egypt and Syria
Rukn ud din Firuz (died 1236), Muslim Turkic ruler and Sultan of Delhi
Rukn al-Dīn Qilij Arslān bin Kaykhusraw, or Kilij Arslan IV (died 1266), Seljuq Sultan of Rûm
al-Malik al-Muzaffar Rukn al-Din Baibars al-Jashnakir al-Mansuri, or Baibars II (died 1309), Mamluk Sultan of Egypt
Baybars al-Mansuri (died 1325), Mamluk-era historiographer
Sheikh Rukn-ud-Din Abul Fath, also known as Rukn-e-Alam (1251–1335), Indian Sufi saint
Rokneddin Mokhtari (1887–1970), Iranian musician and violinist
Rukniddin Sharipov (born 1974), Tajik interned in Guantánamo Bay
Shah Ruknuddin, Sufi saint in Bengal

Arabic masculine given names